Brick: Original Motion Picture Soundtrack is the soundtrack to the 2005 film of the same name. It was released on March 21, 2006 by Lakeshore Records. The soundtrack features the original score for the film composed by Nathan Johnson, lead of The Cinematic Underground as well as music by The Velvet Underground, Bunny Berigan, Anton Karas and Kay Armen and a song from the Gilbert and Sullivan operetta The Mikado recited by Nora Zehetner that was featured in the film.

Scoring process 
This innovative score was composed by Nathan Johnson with additional support and music from The Cinematic Underground. The score harks back to the style, feel and overall texture of noir films. It features traditional instruments such as the piano, trumpet, and violin, but it also contains unique and invented instrument such as the wine-o-phone, metallophone, tack pianos, filing cabinets, and kitchen utensils, all recorded with one microphone on a battered PowerBook.

According to the audio commentary of the Brick DVD, the score was composed almost entirely over iChat, with Rian Johnson playing clips of the movie to Nathan Johnson, who would then score them.

Track listing 
 "Emily's Theme" – Nathan Johnson
 "Sister Ray" – The Velvet Underground
 "The Sun Whose Rays Are All Ablaze" – Nora Zehetner
 "Frankie and Johnny" – Bunny Berigan
 "I'm in the Middle of a Riddle" – Anton Karas, Kay Armen
 "Pale Blue Arrow" – Nathan Johnson
 "Locker 269" – Nathan Johnson
 "Kara's Theme (The Drama Vamp)" - China Kent
 "Laura's Theme" – Nathan Johnson & China Kent
 "The Pin in the Night" – Nathan Johnson, Chris Mears & China Kent
 "Pie House Rats" – Seth Kent
 "Emily's Theme 2 (The White Rabbit)" – Nathan Johnson
 "Emily's Theme 3 (Lunch is Difficult)" – Nathan Johnson & China Kent
 "The Dream and the Tunnel" – Nathan Johnson & Chris Mears
 "Emily's Theme 6 (Reprise)" – Nathan Johnson
 "A Show of Hands" – Nathan Johnson
 "Minneapolis" – Nathan Johnson
 "Front Page News" – Nathan Johnson
 "Knives in My Eyes" – Nathan Johnson
 "The Pin's Lair" – Nathan Johnson
 "Laura's Theme 5 (You Trust Me Now)" – Nathan Johnson & China Kent
 "Ultimate-Tims" – Nathan Johnson & China Kent
 "Turning In" – Nathan Johnson
 "The Pinivan" – Nathan Johnson & China Kent
 "Dode's Threat/South of T-Street" – Nathan Johnson, Chris Mears, Steve Cowley & China Kent
 "The Brick of Brock" – Nathan Johnson & China Kent
 "Four O'Clock (Part 1)" – Nathan Johnson & Chris Mears
 "The Field" – Nathan Johnson & China Kent
 "The Tunnel" – Nathan Johnson & Chris Mears
 "Tug's Tale (Part 2)" – Nathan Johnson & Chris Mears
 "Kabuki Confrontation" – Nathan Johnson, Chris Mears & China Kent
 "Showing Kara's Ace" – Nathan Johnson, Chris Mears & China Kent
 "Four O'Clock (Part 2)" – Nathan Johnson & Chris Mears
 "I'm Sorry Brendan" – Nathan Johnson
 "The Physical Proxy" – Nathan Johnson & China Kent
 "Pale Blue Arrow (Part 2)" – Nathan Johnson & China Kent
 "Building to War" – Nathan Johnson & Chris Mears
 "War" – Nathan Johnson & Chris Mears
 "Laura's Theme (Reprise)" – Nathan Johnson & China Kent
 "The Tale" – Nathan Johnson, China Kent, Chris Mears & Steve Cowley

Credits 
 Original Music Produced and Composed by: Nathan Johnson with The Cinematic Underground
 Music Editor: Drew Deascentis
 Music Supervisor: Joe Rudge
 Music Mixer: Aaron Johnson
 Executive Soundtrack Album Producers for Lakeshore Records: Skip Williamson and Brian McNelis
 Art Director: Stephanie Mente
 Layout by: Joe Chavez

Reviews 

Jonathan Jarry from Soundtrack.net gave the score four stars saying, "This is a score that proudly stands on the fringe of what is called film music by most people. It will be hailed by its fans; it will be booed by the more conservative people among us. When all is said and done, however, how often are these polarizing scores composed and released? I say revel in Brick's insistent crave for originality before Hollywood hits us with yet another serving of reheated piano-and-strings crap."

References

External links 
 The Cinematic Underground's Official Website
 Film's Site

2000s film soundtrack albums
2006 soundtrack albums